Carl Louis Rudolf Alexander Leuckart   (23 June 1854 – 24 July 1889) was a German chemist who discovered the Leuckart reaction and Leuckart thiophenol reaction.

He was the son of Karl Georg Friedrich Rudolf Leuckart (1822–1898) a renowned German zoologist. He received his PhD at the University of Leipzig in 1879 and his habilitation at University of Göttingen in 1883, where he also became professor.

References

1854 births
1889 deaths
19th-century German chemists
People from Giessen